Patrick Cornelis Jacobus Kolijn (born January 9, 1957) is a former Dutch ice hockey player. He played for the Netherlands men's national ice hockey team at the 1980 Winter Olympics in Lake Placid.

References

1957 births
Living people
Dutch ice hockey defencemen
Ice hockey players at the 1980 Winter Olympics
Olympic ice hockey players of the Netherlands
's-Hertogenbosch Red Eagles players
Sportspeople from The Hague